The 1969 Hardie-Ferodo 500 was the tenth running of the Bathurst 500 production car race. It was held on 5 October 1969 at the Mount Panorama Circuit just outside Bathurst in New South Wales, Australia. Cars competed in five classes based on purchase price (Australian dollars) of the vehicle.

The race was won by the newly formed Holden Dealer Team with Colin Bond and Tony Roberts with teammates Peter Brock and Des West finishing third in their Holden Monaro GTS350's, with the team's third car finishing sixth. In between them in second position was defending race winners Bruce McPhee and his single-lap co-driver Barry Mulholland driving a Phase 1 Ford Falcon GTHO. McPhee and Mulholland, who had won in 1968 driving the Holden Monaro GTS327, had originally intended to race a Monaro 350 in 1969 but after receiving no help from Holden, instead decided to race one of the new Falcons.

Peter Brock and Canadian Allan Moffat made their Bathurst débuts in the race. Brock with Harry Firth's Holden Dealer Team, and Moffat driving a works Falcon GTHO with Alan Hamilton. Between them, Brock and Moffat would go on to win 13 of the next 17 Bathurst 500/1000s (until 1987), with Brock winning a record nine times (all for Holden), and Moffat winning four times for Ford.

The Ford Works Team were the favourites to win the race with their new Falcon GTHOs which with their new 5.8-litre (351 cui) V8's proved to have a speed advantage over the 5.7-litre (350 cui) Monaros. However, the decision by Ford Works Team's American manager Al Turner to import special racing tyres for the Falcons proved to be a disaster. During the race numerous tyre failures put the Works cars out of contention. After early tyre failures on the Ian and Leo Geoghegan car, as well as the Fred Gibson and Barry Seton car, Turner called Moffat into the pits for a tyre change. There it was found that Moffat had been far easier on his tyres than either Ian Geoghegan or Seton and that the stop was not necessary. As of 2016, Moffat believes that this decision cost himself and co-driver Alan Hamilton the race win. The day after the race, Ford ran a full page newspaper advert stating "We were a little deflated" referring to the tyre failures.

1969 was also notable for the first lap crash which saw at least one third of the field forced to retire or continue with accident damage. Bill Brown rolled his Falcon GTHO coming through Skyline, all but blocking the track while John French, who qualified 21st, rolled his Alfa Romeo 1750 GTV trying to avoid the carnage that Brown's rollover caused. One driver lucky to escape the carnage was Allan Moffat who had pulled up just out of The Cutting on the first lap with his Falcon stuck in neutral. Once he got going he was able to weave through the bedlam at Skyline and continue on his way. For Brown, it would be the first of three rollovers at Bathurst on the same piece of road (McPhillamy Park - Skyline), with the second in 1971 bringing a lucky escape from death.

Class structure

Class A
The smallest class was for under cars the cost less $1,860. It was made up of Datsun 1000, Hillman Imp, Morris Mini K and Toyota Corolla.

Class B
The $1,861 to $2,250 class was dominated by the Datsun 1600, but also contained Ford Cortina, Hillman Gazelle, Morris 1500, Renault 10 and Volkswagen Type 3.

Class C
The $2,251 to $3,100 class saw a mix of Chrysler Valiant, Fiat 125, Ford Capri, Mazda R100, Morris Cooper S and Renault 16.

Class D
The $3,101 to $4,500 class featured the outright contenders, Ford Falcon GTHO and Holden Monaro, but also contained a single Toyota Corona.

Class E
For cars over $4,500, had a single automatic gearbox version of the Ford Falcon GT but otherwise was all Alfa Romeo with 1750 GTV and a single 1750 Berlina.

Top 10 Qualifiers

Results

Statistics
 Pole Position - #59 Ian Geoghegan - 2:48.9
 Fastest Lap - #61 Moffat/Hamilton & #60 Gibson/Seton - 2:52.1 (lap record)
 Average Speed - 123 km/h
 Race Time - 6:32:25

References

External links
 CAMS Manual reference to Australian titles
 race results

Motorsport in Bathurst, New South Wales
Hardie-Ferodo 500
October 1969 sports events in Australia